The Pilgrim's Road was a route through Asia Minor to the Holy Land. In Volume 4 of Roman Roads & Milestones of Asia Minor, author David H. French reports that the road stretched from Chalcedon to Syria. The surface was paved with small pebbles covered with gravel shortly after the Roman conquest. It was widened from 21.5 feet to 28 feet in the Christian era to accommodate commercial travel.

Three ancient sources attest to the Pilgrim's Road: the Itinerarium Burdigalense, the Itinerarium Antonini, and the Tabula Peutingeriana.

References

History of road transport